Johannes Meyer (also Johann Meier; 24 April 1858 Puhja Parish (now Elva Parish), Kreis Dorpat – 15 April 1945 Adlershorst, Germany) was an Estonian politician. He was a member of Estonian Constituent Assembly. On 26 January 1920, he resigned his position and he was replaced by Georg Stackelberg.

References

1858 births
1945 deaths
People from Elva Parish
People from Kreis Dorpat
Baltic-German people
German-Baltic Party politicians
Members of the Estonian Constituent Assembly
Members of the Riigikogu, 1923–1926
Estonian emigrants to Germany